James Joseph Schiro (January 2, 1946 – August 13, 2014) was an American businessman who became CEO of PriceWaterhouseCoopers and Zurich Financial Services and was a director of number of multinational companies including of PepsiCo, Philips and Goldman Sachs.

Early life
James J. Schiro was born on January 2, 1946, in Brooklyn, New York. Schiro was of Italo-Albanian (Arbëreshë) heritage from Sicily, by Contessa Entellina. He received a Bachelor of Science from St. John's University in New York City in 1967, and an MBA from the Tuck School of Business at Dartmouth College. He was a Certified Public Accountant.

Career
In 1967, he joined Price Waterhouse and worked in various managerial positions. In 1994, he became Chairman of the Board and senior partner. In 1998, after the merger of Price Waterhouse and Coopers & Lybrand, he became CEO of PricewaterhouseCoopers. From 2002 to 2006, he served as the CEO of Zurich Financial Services. He served on the Boards of Directors of PepsiCo, Philips, Goldman Sachs and REVA Medical.

He served on the board of the Geneva Association, where he was involved with the International Association for the Study of Insurance Economics, and he was a member of the European Financial Services Roundtable. He also sat on the Board of Trustees of the Institute for Advanced Study, on the Business Council of the World Economic Forum and on the Board of Directors of Initiative for a Competitive Inner City. He was the former Chairman of the Swiss-American Chamber of Commerce, and the Vice Chairman of the American Friends of Lucerne Festival. He was a member of the Independence Standards Board of the U.S. Securities and Exchange Commission, the American Institute of Certified Public Accountants, and the New York State Society of Public Accountants. He served as Treasurer and Executive Committee member of the United States Council for International Business, the British-North American Committee, the Tri-State United Way Board of Governors, and Board member of the United States-China Business Council.

Honors and politics
He served on the Board of Trustees of his alma mater, St. John's University, and on the Advisory Board of the Tsinghua School of Economics and Management in Beijing. He received the Avenue of the Americas Association's Gold Key Award in 1992, the Ellis Island Medal of Honor in 1994, and the American Jewish Committee's National Human Relations Award in 1997.

A Republican, he supported John McCain for President in 2000 and 2008, and George W. Bush in 2004. He supported Al D'Amato and Rudy Giuliani.

Personal life
He was married to Tomasina Schiro, and they have two children, Justine and James Jr.

He died in Princeton, New Jersey on August 13, 2014, of multiple myeloma. He was 68 years old.

References

1946 births
2014 deaths
Deaths from multiple myeloma
American corporate directors
20th-century American Jews
American people of Arbëreshë descent
Directors of Goldman Sachs
Directors of Philips
People from Brooklyn
PepsiCo people
PricewaterhouseCoopers people
St. John's University (New York City) alumni
Trustees of the Institute for Advanced Study
Tuck School of Business alumni
21st-century American Jews